Leonard West (31 May 1879 – 26 January 1945) was a Scottish international rugby union player.

Rugby Union career

Amateur career

He played for Edinburgh University.

He played for Carlisle.

He played for London Scottish.

He played for West Hartlepool.

Provincial career

He represented Edinburgh District in December 1902 against Glasgow District in the inter-city match.

He played for Cities District in January 1903 against Provinces District.

While with Carlisle, he turned out for Anglo-Scots on 24 December 1904.

International career

He received 9 caps for Scotland.

Medical career

He obtained his medical degree from Edinburgh University in 1903.

Family

He was the son of Thomas Edward West (1833 - 1901). Thomas was a barrister at law.

His mother was Mary Cordelia Parrinton (1844 - 1908).

References

1879 births
1945 deaths
Scottish rugby union players
Rugby union forwards
Scotland international rugby union players
Edinburgh District (rugby union) players
Carlisle RFC players
West Hartlepool R.F.C. players
London Scottish F.C. players
Edinburgh University RFC players
Cities District players
Scottish Exiles (rugby union) players
Anglo-Scots
Rugby union players from Bradford
Alumni of the University of Edinburgh